Kenneth Boyd Sidwell (January 23, 1936 – December 25, 2022) was an American college head basketball and baseball head coach. He coached Belmont's basketball team from 1962 to 1964 and again from 1972 to 1974, as well as Tennessee Tech from 1964 to 1969. In baseball, Sidwell coached Belmont from 1963 to 1964. He was also the first full-time athletic director in Belmont's history. He was inducted into Belmont's Hall of Fame as a coach and administrator in 1993.

As an athlete, Sidwell starred in both sports when he attended Tennessee Tech. In his four-year basketball career, Sidwell was a three-time all-Ohio Valley Conference player, a Little College All-American, and when he graduated he was the school's all-time leading scorer. He had his jersey retired and was inducted into Tennessee Tech's Hall of Fame in 1977.

Sidwell died in Franklin, Tennessee, on December 25, 2022, at the age of 86.

Head coaching record

Basketball

Baseball

References

1936 births
2022 deaths
Baseball coaches from Kentucky
Basketball coaches from Kentucky
Baseball players from Kentucky
Basketball players from Kentucky
Belmont Bruins athletic directors
Belmont Bruins baseball coaches
Belmont Bruins men's basketball coaches
Guards (basketball)
High school basketball coaches in the United States
People from Franklin, Tennessee
People from Hart County, Kentucky
Tennessee Tech Golden Eagles baseball players
Tennessee Tech Golden Eagles men's basketball coaches
Tennessee Tech Golden Eagles men's basketball players
American men's basketball players